Miaoli (苗栗市) is a county-controlled city and the county seat of Miaoli County, Taiwan.

Miaoli may also refer to:

Miaoli County (苗栗縣), a county located in central Taiwan, Republic of China
Miaoli TRA station, rail station in Miaoli, Miaoli, Taiwan
Miaoli HSR station, rail station in Houlong, Miaoli, Taiwan
Miaoli Hills, in Miaoli, Taiwan
Miaoli, Zhengzhou (庙李镇), town in Jinshui District, Zhengzhou, People's Republic of China

See also
Miaoli County Council
Miaoli County Government
Miao (disambiguation)
Li (disambiguation)